Cantherhines macrocerus, commonly known as the whitespotted filefish or American whitespotted filefish, is a marine fish found along the coast of Florida extending southward into the Caribbean. This species is distinct and separate from Cantherhines dumerilii, the similarly named whitespotted filefish which is found in the Indian and Pacific oceans.

Description 

The American whitespotted filefish typically has a brown or olive colored body, although it may also be grey.  These fish can rapidly change appearance to a high contrast color pattern with a much darker background and many light colored spots With a maximum length of around 18 inches, they are smaller than the scrawled filefish which is also found in their range.  The American whitespotted filefish is often seen in pairs.

Diet 
These fish are omnivorous; although they eat animals like sponges, stinging coral and gorgonians, and algae.

As aquarium fish 
The American whitespotted filefish can be kept in large aquariums.  These fish are non-aggressive, need plenty of places to hide, and will eat brine shrimp, krill and algae.

References

External links 
  - ReefGuide's whitespotted filefish photos showing animals with and without spots
 
 

Monacanthidae
Fish described in 1853